White Oak Run is a  long 3rd order tributary to Loyalhanna Creek in Westmoreland County, Pennsylvania.

Variant names
According to the Geographic Names Information System, it has also been known historically as: 
 Whiteoak Run

Course

Watershed
White Oak Run drains  of area, receives about 49.9 in/year of precipitation, has a topographic wetness index of 378.29, and has an average water temperature of 8.74 °C.  The watershed is 92% forested.

Additional Images

References

Rivers of Westmoreland County, Pennsylvania
Rivers of Pennsylvania